Her Majesty Queen Elizabeth II christened many ships throughout her reign, both naval, scientific, and passenger vessels. The following is a list of all the ships she named during her lifetime, from the HMS Vanguard to the Britannia.

List of  Ships

Film Links 
 HMS Vanguard naming & launching (1944)
 British Princess tanker christening (1946)
 Caronia naming ceremony & launching (1947)
 Britannia christening & launching (1953)
 Southern Cross christening & launching (1954)
 Empress of Britain christening & launching (1955)
 QE2 christening & launching (1967)
 Oriana christening (1995)
 Queen Elizabeth naming ceremony (2010)
 HMS Queen Elizabeth naming ceremony (2014)

Sources 

Elizabeth II